Mount Shavano is a high mountain summit in the southern Sawatch Range of the Rocky Mountains of North America. The mountain was named in honor of Ute Chief Shavano.

Mountain
Mount Shavano lies just east of the Continental Divide and just west of the Arkansas River rising 7,200 feet above the town of Salida in Chaffee County to the southeast. Mount Shavano lies in the south-central part of the Sawatch Range, north of Mount Ouray and Mount Chipeta and south of the Collegiate Peaks (including Mount Princeton, Mount Harvard, and Mount Yale). Mount Shavano is famous for the Angel of Shavano, a snow formation in the image of an angel that emerges on the east face of the mountain during snow melt each spring.

Historical names
Mount Chavanaux
Mount Shavano – 1981 
Mount Usher
Shavano Peak – 1906

See also

List of mountain peaks of Colorado
List of Colorado fourteeners

References

External links
Mount Shavano on 14ers.com

Shavano
Shavano
San Isabel National Forest
Shavano
Shavano